Yury Astravukh (born 21 January 1988) is a Belarusian footballer (defender) who plays for Slutsk.

Honours
BATE Borisov
Belarusian Premier League champion: 2007

Minsk
Belarusian Cup winner: 2012–13

External links
 Player profile on official FC BATE website
 
 

1988 births
Living people
People from Lida
Sportspeople from Grodno Region
Belarusian footballers
Association football defenders
FC Lida players
FC BATE Borisov players
FC Savit Mogilev players
FC Belshina Bobruisk players
FC Torpedo-BelAZ Zhodino players
FC Rechitsa-2014 players
FC Minsk players
FC Dinamo Minsk players
FC Slutsk players